Krasnotalovsky is a rural locality (a khutor) in Trostyanskoye Rural Settlement, Yelansky District, Volgograd Oblast, Russia. The population was 456 as of 2010. There are 4 streets.

Geography 
Krasnotalovsky is located on Khopyorsko-Buzulukskaya Plain, on the bank of the Buzuluk River, 36 km southwest of Yelan (the district's administrative centre) by road. Trostyanka is the nearest rural locality.

References 

Rural localities in Yelansky District